Marcel Rosenbach (born 1972, Koblenz) is a German journalist.

At Hamburg University he studied political science and journalism (1993–1998), and after graduating, he attended the Henri Nannen School of Journalism.

Before joining Der Spiegel in 2001, he worked as an editor for Berliner Zeitung.

Books
Staatsfeind WikiLeaks. Wie eine Gruppe von Netzaktivisten die mächtigsten Nationen der Welt herausfordert ("State Enemy WikiLeaks. How a Group of Net Activists Challenges the Most Powerful Nations of the World"), DVA, München 2011, .
 with : Der NSA-Komplex. Edward Snowden und der Weg in die totale Überwachung, München 2014, .

Awards 
Journalist of the Year, 2013 (with Holger Stark, awarded by Medium Magazin)
German TV Award, 2014

References

1972 births
German journalists
German male journalists
Writers from Koblenz
Living people
German male writers
Der Spiegel people